Formignana is a comune (municipality) in the Province of Ferrara in the Italian region Emilia-Romagna, located about  northeast of Bologna and about  east of Ferrara.

Formignana borders the following municipalities: Copparo, Ferrara, Jolanda di Savoia, Tresigallo.

Demographic evolution

References

External links
 www.comune.formignana.fe.it/

Cities and towns in Emilia-Romagna